Lu Yonghua is a Chinese billionaire businessman. He founded and currently serves as CEO for Linyang Electronics, founded in 1995. From 1988-96, he was the general manager of the computing firm Qidong Changtong Computer. He also founded Hanwha SolarOne, originally called Jiangsu Linyang Solarfun.

References

Businesspeople from Nantong
Billionaires from Jiangsu
People from Qidong, Jiangsu
Living people
Year of birth missing (living people)